Woo Hoo, WooHoo, and spelling variants may refer to:

Songs
"Woo-Hoo" (Rock-A-Teens song), 1959
"Woohoo" (Christina Aguilera song), 2010
"Woo Hoo", the B-side from "Fans" by Kings of Leon
"WooHoo", a song by Newsboys from Step Up to the Microphone
"Woohoo", a 2014 song by Eli "Paperboy" Reed from his album Nights Like This
"Woohoo", a song by South Korean girl group Twice from their album, Page Two
"Song 2", a 1997 song by alternative rock band Blur that prominently features the phrase "Woo Hoo!" in the chorus
 "Windows Down", song by Big Time Rush (group) originally titled "Woo Hoo"

Other
 Whoo hoo, a marketing campaign by the bank Washington Mutual
 Woohoo – a 19th-century English name for the Hawaiian island of Oahu

See also
 Wuhu (disambiguation)
 Woo (disambiguation)
 Wahoo (disambiguation)